The 1964 United States presidential election in Rhode Island took place on November 3, 1964, as part of the 1964 United States presidential election, which was held throughout all 50 states and D.C. Voters chose four representatives, or electors to the Electoral College, who voted for president and vice president.

Rhode Island voted overwhelmingly for the Democratic nominee, incumbent President Lyndon B. Johnson of Texas, over the Republican nominee, Senator Barry Goldwater of Arizona. Johnson ran with Senator Hubert H. Humphrey of Minnesota, while Goldwater’s running mate was Congressman William E. Miller of New York.

Johnson carried Rhode Island in a landslide, taking 80.87% of the vote to Goldwater’s 19.13%, a Democratic victory margin of 61.74%. This made Rhode Island Lyndon Johnson’s strongest state in the nation: even in the midst of a massive nationwide Democratic landslide, Rhode Island weighed in as 39% more Democratic than the national average during the 1964 election.

The staunch conservative Goldwater was widely seen in the Northeastern United States as a right-wing extremist; he had voted against the Civil Rights Act of 1964, and the Johnson campaign portrayed him as a warmonger who as president would provoke a nuclear war. While John F. Kennedy had won 63.63% in Rhode Island in 1960 mostly by sweeping the ethnic Catholic vote, for 1964, this traditional Democratic coalition was joined by mass defections of moderate Yankee Republicans who had voted for Eisenhower and Nixon but could not support Goldwater. His landslide was so large, he won a record 315,463 votes, a record that still has not been beaten. The closest any candidate has come since then was in 2020, when Joe Biden took 306,192 votes. Consequently, the incumbent Johnson was able to take more than 80% of the vote in liberal Rhode Island.

Johnson swept all 5 counties in Rhode Island with over 70% of the vote. In Providence County, the most populated county, home to the state’s capital and largest city, Providence, Johnson took 83.5% of the vote. This was the strongest showing ever for a Democratic presidential candidate in Providence County and the strongest performance of any candidate of any party in any county in Rhode Island.

Johnson’s 80.87% remains the highest vote share percentage any presidential candidate of either party has ever received in Rhode Island, and his 61.74% victory margin remains the widest margin by which any candidate of either party has ever won the state. In fact, this is the last time a presidential candidate has won such a large proportion of the statewide vote in any state.

Results

By county

See also
 United States presidential elections in Rhode Island

References

1964
Rhode Island
1964 Rhode Island elections